The following is an alphabetical list of topics related to the Co-operative Republic of Guyana.

0–9

.gy – Internet country code top-level domain for Guyana

A
Abortion in Guyana
Adjacent countries:

Afro-Guyanese people
Agriculture in Guyana
Akawaio language
Air Force of Guyana
Airports in Guyana
Amazon rainforest
Ambassador of Guyana to the United Nations
Americas
South America
North Atlantic Ocean
Islands of Guyana
Anglo-America
Arawak language
Army of Guyana
Atlantic Ocean
Atlas of Guyana

B
Bank of Guyana
Barbados–Guyana relations
Bartica
Birds of Guyana
Bishops' High School, Guyana

C
Capital of Guyana: Georgetown
Caribbean Community (CARICOM)
Categories:
:Category:Guyana
:Category:Buildings and structures in Guyana
:Category:Communications in Guyana
:Category:Economy of Guyana
:Category:Education in Guyana
:Category:Environment of Guyana
:Category:Geography of Guyana
:Category:Government of Guyana
:Category:Guyana stubs
:Category:Guyana-related lists
:Category:Guyanese culture
:Category:Guyanese people
:Category:Health in Guyana
:Category:History of Guyana
:Category:Images of Guyana
:Category:Law of Guyana
:Category:Military of Guyana
:Category:Politics of Guyana
:Category:Science and technology in Guyana
:Category:Society of Guyana
:Category:Sport in Guyana
:Category:Transport in Guyana
commons:Category:Guyana
Cheddi Jagan International Airport
Chief Justice of Guyana
Cities in Guyana
Climate of Guyana
Coat of arms of Guyana
Co-operative Republic of Guyana
Commonwealth of Nations
Communications in Guyana
Companies of Guyana
Courantyne River
Crime in Guyana
Cuisine of Guyana
Culture of Guyana

D
Demerara Harbour Bridge
Demerara-Mahaica
Demerara River
Demographics of Guyana
Diplomatic missions of Guyana

E
Economy of Guyana
Education in Guyana
Elections in Guyana
Electricity sector in Guyana
English colonization of the Americas
English language
Essequibo River

F

Flag of Guyana
Foreign relations of Guyana
Fort Kyk-Over-Al
Freedom of religion in Guyana

G
Geography of Guyana
Georgetown – Capital of Guyana
Government of Guyana
Gross domestic product
Guyana
Guyana at the Olympics
Guyana Stock Exchange
Guyanese British people
Guyanese Canadians
Guyanese Creole language
Guyanese people

H
Health in Guyana
Hinduism in Guyana
History of Guyana

I
Indo-Guyanese people
International Organization for Standardization (ISO)
ISO 3166-1 alpha-2 country code for Guyana: GY
ISO 3166-1 alpha-3 country code for Guyana: GUY
ISO 3166-2:GY region codes for Guyana
Internet in Guyana
Islam in Guyana
Islands of Guyana

J
Jonestown

K
Kaieteur Falls

L
Languages of Guyana
Leguan Island
LGBT rights in Guyana
Lists related to Guyana:
Ambassador of Guyana to the United Nations
Diplomatic missions of Guyana
List of airports in Guyana
List of birds of Guyana
List of cities in Guyana
List of companies of Guyana
List of countries by GDP (nominal)
List of Guyana-related topics
List of islands of Guyana
List of political parties in Guyana
List of presidents of Guyana
List of rivers of Guyana
List of schools in Guyana
List of universities in Guyana
Topic outline of Guyana
Literature of Guyana

M
Mazaruni River
Macushi
Macushi language
Maopityan Falls
Military of Guyana
Music of Guyana

N
National Cultural Centre
Neighborhood Councils of Guyana
Northern Hemisphere

O
Ogle Airport

P
Parika
Parliament Building, Guyana
Pemon
People of Guyana
Peoples Temple Agricultural Project
Political parties in Guyana
Politics of Guyana
Pomeroon River
President of Guyana
List of presidents of Guyana
Prime Minister of Guyana
Prostitution in Guyana

Q
Quamina
Queen's College, Guyana

R
Regions of Guyana
Religion in Guyana

S
The Scout Association of Guyana
Soesdyke-Linden Highway
South America

T
Topic outline of Guyana
Transport in Guyana

U
Umana Yana
United Nations, member state since 1966
United States-Guyana relations
Universities in Guyana
University of Guyana

V

 Venezuelan crisis of 1895
 Visa policy of Guyana

W
Waiwai language
Wai-Wai people
Warao language
Warao people
Water supply and sanitation in Guyana
Western Hemisphere

Outline of Guyana
Women in Guyana

X

Y

Z

See also

Commonwealth of Nations
List of international rankings
Lists of country-related topics
Topic outline of geography
Topic outline of Guyana
Topic outline of South America
United Nations

External links

 
Guyana